Jeanne-Marie Lanvin (1 January 1867 – 6 July 1946) was a French haute couture fashion designer. She founded the Lanvin fashion house and the beauty and perfume company Lanvin Parfums.

Early life

Jeanne Lanvin was born in Paris on 1 January 1867, the eldest of 11 children of Constantin Lanvin and Sophie Deshayes.  She became an apprentice milliner at Madame Félix in Paris at the age of 16. She trained with Suzanne Talbot and Caroline Montagne Roux before becoming a milliner on the rue du Faubourg Saint-Honoré in 1889.

Career

In 1909, Lanvin joined the Syndicat de la Couture (fr), which marked her formal status as a couturière. The clothing Lanvin made for her daughter began to attract the attention of a number of wealthy people who requested copies for their own children. Soon, Lanvin was making dresses for their mothers, and some of the most famous names in Europe were included in the clientele of her new boutique on the rue du Faubourg Saint-Honoré, Paris.

 From 1923, the Lanvin empire included a dye factory in Nanterre. In the 1920s, Lanvin opened shops devoted to home décor, menswear, furs and lingerie. Her most significant endeavour was the creation of Lanvin Parfums SA in 1924. Her signature fragrance, Arpège, introduced in 1927, was inspired by the sound of her daughter Marguerite practicing her scales on the piano. (Arpège is French for arpeggio.)

In 1922, Lanvin collaborated with celebrated French designer Armand-Albert Rateau in redesigning her apartment, her homes and her businesses. The living room, boudoir and bathroom of the apartment was reassembled in 1985 in the Musée des Arts Décoratifs, Paris. For this domicile, Rateau designed some remarkable 1920–22 furniture in bronze. 

The pair developed a friendship. Rateau came aboard Lanvin's empire as manager of Lanvin-Sport, designing the Lanvin spherical La Boule perfume flacon for Arpège, originally produced by the Manufacture Nationale de Sèvres. To this day, Arpège perfume containers are imprinted with Paul Iribe's gold image (rendered in 1907) of Lanvin and her daughter Marguerite. Rateau also managed Lanvin-Décoration, an interior-design department established in 1920, in the main store on the rue du Faubourg Saint-Honoré.

Personal life, death and legacy
In 1895, Lanvin married Count Emilio di Pietro, an Italian nobleman. Two years later she gave birth to a daughter, Marguerite (also known as Marie-Blanche) (1897–1958). The couple's only child, Marguerite di Pietro became an opera singer. She married the Count Jean de Polignac (1888–1943). On the death of her mother, she became the director of the Lanvin fashion house. 

Lanvin and di Pietro divorced in 1903. Lanvin married Xavier Melet in 1907, a journalist at the newspaper Les Temps and later the French consul in Manchester, England.

Lanvin died on 6 July 1946. Her original office is preserved in Lanvin's corporate offices at 16 Rue Boissy d’Anglas in Paris.

Awards
 Chevalier de l'Ordre de la Légion d'Honneur, to Jeanne Lanvin, 1926
 Officier de l'Ordre de la Légion d'Honneur, to Jeanne Lanvin, 1938

See also
Lanvin (clothing) for more information on the fashion house
 Arpège

Collection at the Metropolitan Museum of Art, New York

References

Sources
 Colette, Emilio Terry, et al. (1965). Homage à Marie-Blanche, Comtesse Jean de Polignac, Monaco.
 "Jeanne Lanvin" and "Claude Montana" in Morgan, Ann (1984). Contemporary Designers, New York: Macmillan. | 
 "Castillo", "Jules-François Crahay", and "Jean Gaumont-Lanvin" in Remaury, Bruno, director (1994). Dictionnaire de la Mode au XXe Siècle, Paris: Éditions du Regard. | 
 Barillé, Elisabeth (1997). Lanvin, Paris: Assouline. | )
 Picon, Jérôme (2002). Jeanne Lanvin, Paris: Flammarion. | 
 "Armand Albert Rateau" and "Jeanne Lanvin" in Byars, Mel (2004). The Design Encyclopedia, New York: The Museum of Modern Art. | 
 Menkes, Suzy (24 May 2005). "At Lanvin, a master of improvisation", International Herald Tribune.

External links
 Lanvin home page

 Biography of Lanvin of Toutenparfum.com
 The 'Jeanne Lanvin' fragrance, named after Lanvin's founder, on the Lanvin Parfums website
 
 

French fashion designers
Fashion designers from Paris
French businesspeople in fashion
20th-century French businesswomen
20th-century French businesspeople
1867 births
1946 deaths
Chevaliers of the Légion d'honneur
Officiers of the Légion d'honneur
Children's clothing designers
French women fashion designers